William P. Clements High School, more commonly known as Clements High School, is a public high school in First Colony and Sugar Land within the U.S. state of Texas that is named after former Texas governor Bill Clements and is a part of the Fort Bend Independent School District. The school serves most of First Colony, and a portion of Telfair. It previously served sections of Riverstone until district rezoning prior to the 2014-2015 school year.

Clements High School has been recognized by Texas Monthly magazine in its list of the top high schools in the state of Texas. In US News magazine's 2018 ranking of United States high schools, Clements was ranked 446th out of 27,000 high schools nationwide. In 2010 and 2011, Clements High School was rated Exemplary.

History
Clements was occupied in 1983, making it FBISD's third comprehensive high school.

The school was named after William P. Clements.
In 2009, Lee Crews, former head principal of both First Colony Middle School and Quail Valley Middle School, was named head principal of Clements. In 2011, Kenneth Gregorski, formerly of Crockett Middle School, was named head principal. In 2013, David Yaffie, formerly of Baines Middle School, was named head principal. In 2022, Brian Shillingburg, formerly of James Bowie Middle School, was named head principal.  He previously served as a Math Science Instructional Specialist at Spring Independent School District and assistant principal beginning in 2012 at Landrum Middle School in Spring Branch Independent School District.

Academics
In 2014, Clements was ranked number 10 on the Best Math and Science High Schools in the Houston-Area list, and was listed as number 3 on the Best High Schools in the Houston-Area list.  The average 2019 SAT scores were Math 690 and Verbal 660. The average 2019 ACT score was a 30. The average passing rate on AP exams was 92% in 2019. Clements is often recognized as one of the best high schools in the state of Texas, and has been ranked "Exemplary" by the Texas Education Agency for over 15 years.

Extracurricular activities
In the 2010-2011 academic school year, Clements High School hosted the annual Texas French Symposium competition

The Clements men's soccer team was the 5A Texas state championship team in 2014, led by Todd Ericson.

Clements participated in the 2016 National Science Bowl, finishing in third place with an all-freshman team.

As of 2017, Clements DECA was the largest DECA Chapter in Texas by membership and has been one of the top 10 largest in the world for five years.

Clements has the largest number of degrees in the National Speech and Debate Association East Texas District, making it a prominent speech and debate school. The school has gotten first at the Texas Forensic Association State Tournament in Public Forum Debate in 2009, in Congressional Debate in 2013, and in Public Forum Debate in 2015. In 2016, Clements was the runner-up in Lincoln Douglas Debate at the Tournament of Champions.

Feeder patterns
The following elementary schools feed into Clements:
Colony Bend
Austin Parkway (partial)
Colony Meadows
Commonwealth (partial)
Settlers Way (partial)
Cornerstone
The following middle schools feed into Clements:
Fort Settlement Middle School (partial)(FSMS)
First Colony Middle School (partial)(FCMS)
Sartartia Middle School(partial)(SMS)

Demographics
As of Spring 2017:

American Indian/Alaskan Native 0.39%
Asian 54.23%
Black/African American 5.96%
Native Hawaiian/Pacific Islander (unknown)
White 24.18%
Hispanic or Latino 11.95%
2 or more races 3.25%

Notoriety

Counter-Strike map controversy 
In 2007, one day following the Virginia Tech shooting, the school received a phone call from a parent who complained that her child was playing a PC game involving shooting and killing people in an animated map of the school. Following the call, school officials promptly discovered the website where a 17-year-old alumni was distributing the map as a mod for Counter-Strike. Police searched his home under consent from her mother. They found nothing illegal, but confiscated five decorative swords and ordered the boy to erase the game and maps from his computer. Although he was not charged for the incident, he was subsequently transferred to an alternative education center. The incident caused a rift within the districts board of trustees, with some suggesting that the district's reaction was overwrought. It also angered the local Chinese-American community, of which the boy and his family were apart of.

Cyber-bullying
Clements, along with the other Fort Bend High Schools of Elkins and Dulles, was subject to an act of cyber terrorism when a list titled Whimsical Girls of FBISD was posted on Facebook in April 2010. The list named several female students from the three high schools with graphic detail of promiscuous acts that the girls performed, locations of the acts, as well as severe name calling. While some described this as tattle-taling, others argued that the list was a direct form of verbal assault and demanded the expulsion of the offender who posted the list.

Brian Yuen 
On October 15, 2016, Brian Yuen, a 17-year-old member of the school's aquatics team, experienced a major medical emergency while competing at the Don Cook Natatorium. Staff preformed CPR until paramedics arrived. He died shortly after being transported to the hospital. A vigil for him was attended by hundreds of family members, friends, and local community members. A GoFundMe established by his brother Charles raised $30,000 in funeral and medical expenses. A moment of silence was held at a football game between Ridge Point and Dulles High Schools that day, with cheerleaders and attendees wearing blue, Yuen's favorite color.

Bomb-making student 
On May 15, 2019, Maximillion Young, a 17-year-old ninth-grader at Clements High School, was arrested for possession of explosive components. The district stated that a week prior, a parent has disclosed to them via email that her daughter had informed her that Young had told the daughter that he knew how to make bombs, and that he sought to sell them and make his own gunpowder.  According to the girl, he would frequently make remarks about using glass, plastic, or rocks in said bombs and that these objects at high velocities would shred people apart. He told her that people in high school are going nowhere in life and that they were not worth the time and that she was the only one who was nice to him. He stated that he was a sociopath and liked to see things go "boom." He hinted at intentions of using the bombs to blow up the school.

On May 9, a warrant was issued to search Young's home. Police arrived at the Young residence that same day. Officers discovered Potassium Nitrate, Charcoal and Sulfur in a tool shed. Young's father led the officers to a detached garage, where they found a bottle of stump remover, a bottle of sulfur dust, and a grey and white colored bowl that contained a metal pipe inside. A "black powdery substance" was also discovered by investigators.

Young's father allegedly told authorities that his son enjoyed chemistry and had been viewing YouTube videos on how to make gunpowder. The FBI became involved on May 13, who concluded that the discovered materials could be used to make a pipe bomb. Another search was conducted on the same day, with military-style equipment being found, including body armor with wires hanging out from it, a helmet, airsoft guns made to look like real rifles, an AR-15 style rifle firearm, handgun, shotgun, and two military style ammunition boxes found in a safe of a guestroom closet. More bomb making material was found, including two "energetic powders" that were deemed two dangerous to store in the Fort Bend ISD Police Department's property room.

Young's bond was set to $25,000. He has since been bonded out.

Notable alumni

Craig Ackerman - play-by-play announcer for NBA's Houston Rockets
Matt Albers - Major League Baseball pitcher, Washington Nationals
Derek Carr  (Class of 2009)- NFL quarterback, Las Vegas Raiders   
Jennifer Don - US Figure Skating national medalist, World Junior bronze medalist, National Champion of Taiwan
JC Gonzalez - actor, songwriter, singer; participated in Victorious, Parks and Recreation, Blue, Los Americans and others.
Daniella Guzman - journalist with local TV station KPRC-TV (2006-2012 and 2022–present)
Clay Helton - former USC head football coach, and current head coach at Georgia Southern University. 
Tyson Helton - football coach
John King - Major League Baseball pitcher, Texas Rangers
K. J. Noons - professional mixed martial artist, won inaugural EliteXC Lightweight Championship, UFC Welterweight
Loral O'Hara - engineer and NASA astronaut.
Mark Quinn - Major League Baseball outfielder, Kansas City Royals
Jon Schillaci - Serial Rapist and FBI Ten Most Wanted Fugitive.
Rashawn Slater - offensive lineman for NFL's Los Angeles Chargers
Bryan Stoltenberg - lineman for NFL's San Diego Chargers, New York Giants, Carolina Panthers; member of 1995 College Football All-America Team
Allison Tolman - actress, played Molly Solverson in FX television series Fargo
Patrick Wang - actor, writer, director
Thomas Bartlett Whitaker - Convicted murder
Kevin Wu - internet personality and early YouTube celebrity, known by the username KevJumba

References

External links

 Alternate URL
Clements High School Alumni Website
Report from GreatSchools.net

Fort Bend Independent School District high schools
Schools in Sugar Land, Texas
Magnet schools in Texas
Educational institutions established in 1983
1983 establishments in Texas